Redwater-Andrew was a provincial electoral district in Alberta, Canada mandated to return a single member to the Legislative Assembly of Alberta using the first-past-the-post method of voting from 1971 to 1993.

History

Boundary history
Redwater-Andrew was created in 1971 from most of the Redwater district, including the communities of Redwater and Smoky Lake, and a part of Willingdon-Two Hills south of the North Saskatchewan River. In 1986 it gained a portion of Clover Bar, including Lamont, and lost some territory to Westlock-Sturgeon. In 1993 the bulk of its area was redistributed to Redwater and Vegreville-Viking, with smaller portions going to Lac La Biche-St. Paul and Clover Bar-Fort Saskatchewan.

Representation history
Despite two-term Social Credit MLA for Redwater Michael Senych running in the new constituency, it was picked up by Progressive Conservative George Topolnisky by a wide margin in the 1971 election, which saw his party sweep to power. Topolinsky held the seat for four terms, despite healthy challenges by the New Democrats. Michael Senych also attempted to re-take the seat twice, as an independent in 1982 and with the Representative Party in 1986.

When Topolinsky retired in 1986, Steve Zarusky held the seat for the PCs despite a strong NDP performance. He was re-elected in 1989, and the district was abolished at the end of his second term. He ran unsuccessfully in the re-constituted Redwater district.

Election results

1970s

1980s

See also
List of Alberta provincial electoral districts

References

Further reading

External links
Elections Alberta
The Legislative Assembly of Alberta

Former provincial electoral districts of Alberta